Ethiopian Airlines Flight 302 was a scheduled international passenger flight from Addis Ababa Bole International Airport in Ethiopia to Jomo Kenyatta International Airport in Nairobi, Kenya. On 10 March 2019, the Boeing 737 MAX 8 aircraft which operated the flight crashed near the town of Bishoftu six minutes after takeoff, killing all 157 people aboard.

Flight 302 is Ethiopian Airlines's deadliest accident to date, surpassing the fatal hijacking of Flight 961 resulting in a crash near the Comoros in 1996. It is also the deadliest aircraft accident to occur in Ethiopia, surpassing the crash of an Ethiopian Air Force Antonov An-26 in 1982, which killed 73.

This was the second MAX 8 accident in less than five months after the crash of Lion Air Flight 610. Both crashes prompted a two-year worldwide long term grounding of the jet and an investigation into how the aircraft was approved to service.

Aircraft and crew 
The aircraft was a Boeing 737 MAX 8, registered ET-AVJ with a manufacturer's serial number of 62450, (construction number 7243), powered by two CFM International LEAP-1B engines. The aircraft was manufactured in October 2018 and delivered on 15 November 2018, making it around four months old at the time of the accident. It had flown from Johannesburg, South Africa as ET858 the night prior.

The captain of the plane was Yared Getachew, 29, who had been flying with the airline for almost nine years and had logged a total of 8,122 flight hours, including 4,120 hours on the Boeing 737. He had been a Boeing 737-800 captain since November 2017, and Boeing 737 MAX since July 2018. At the time of the accident, he was the youngest captain at the airline. The first officer, Ahmed Nur Mohammod Nur, 25, was a recent graduate from the airline's academy with 361 flight hours logged, including 207 hours on the Boeing 737.

Accident
Flight 302 was a scheduled international passenger flight from Addis Ababa to Nairobi. The aircraft took off from Addis Ababa at 08:38 local time (05:38 UTC) with 149 passengers and 8 crew on board.

One minute into the flight, the first officer, acting on the instructions of the captain, reported a "flight control" problem to the control tower.

Two minutes into the flight, the plane's MCAS system activated, pitching the plane into a dive toward the ground. The pilots struggled to control it and managed to prevent the nose from diving further, but the plane continued to lose altitude.

The MCAS then activated again, dropping the nose even further down. The pilots then flipped a pair of switches to disable the electrical trim tab system, which also disabled the MCAS software. However, in shutting off the electrical trim system, they also shut off their ability to trim the stabilizer into a neutral position with the electrical switch located on their yokes. The only other possible way to move the stabilizer would be by cranking the wheel by hand, but because the stabilizer was located opposite to the elevator, strong aerodynamic forces were acting on it.

As the pilots had inadvertently left the engines on full takeoff power, which caused the plane to accelerate at high speed, there was further pressure on the stabilizer. The pilots' attempts to manually crank the stabilizer back into position failed.

Three minutes into the flight, with the aircraft continuing to lose altitude and accelerating beyond its safety limits, the captain instructed the first officer to request permission from air traffic control to return to the airport. Permission was granted, and the air traffic controllers diverted other approaching flights. Following instructions from air traffic control, they turned the aircraft to the east, and it rolled to the right. The right wing came to point down as the turn steepened.

At 8:43, having struggled to keep the plane's nose from diving further by manually pulling the yoke, the captain asked the first officer to help him, and turned the electrical trim tab system back on in the hope that it would allow him to put the stabilizer back into neutral trim. However, in turning the trim system back on, he also reactivated the MCAS system, which pushed the nose further down. The captain and first officer attempted to raise the nose by manually pulling their yokes, but the aircraft continued to plunge toward the ground.

The aircraft disappeared from radar screens and crashed at almost 08:44, six minutes after takeoff. Flight tracking data showed that the aircraft's altitude and rate of climb and descent were fluctuating. Several witnesses stated the plane trailed "white smoke" and made strange noises before crashing. There were no survivors.

Wreckage was strewn around the field along with personal effects and body parts.

Emergency response
Shortly after the crash, police and a firefighting crew from a nearby Ethiopian Air Force base arrived and extinguished the fires caused by the crash. Police cordoned off the site, and Ethiopian Red Cross personnel and air crash investigators moved in. Together with local villagers, they sifted through the wreckage, recovering pieces of the aircraft, personal effects, and human remains. Trucks and excavators were brought in to assist in clearing the crash site. Human remains found were bagged and taken to Bole International Airport for storage in refrigeration units typically used to store roses destined for export, before being taken to St. Paul's Hospital in Addis Ababa for storage pending identification. Personnel from Interpol and Blake Emergency Services, a private British disaster response firm contracted by the Ethiopian government, arrived to gather human tissue for DNA testing, and an Israel Police forensics team also arrived to assist in identifying the remains of the two Israeli victims of the crash. The Chinese railway construction firm CRSG, later joined by another construction firm, CCCC, brought in large scale equipment including excavators and trucks. They recovered both flight recorders on the 11th of March, with the first being found at 9 am and the second flight recorder found at 1 pm. The black boxes were given to Ethiopian Airlines and were sent to Paris for inspection by the BEA, the French aviation accident investigation agency.

Passengers 
The airline stated that the flight's 149 passengers had 35 different nationalities. Crash victim positive identification was announced on September 13, 2019. Nearly a hundred disaster victim identification (DVI) experts from 14 countries supported the Interpol Incident Response Team (IRT) mission.

All passengers and crew on board, 157 in total, were killed in the accident. Many of the passengers were travelling to Nairobi to attend the fourth session of the United Nations Environment Assembly. A total of 22 people affiliated with the United Nations (UN) were killed, including seven World Food Programme staff, along with staff of the United Nations office in Nairobi, the International Telecommunication Union, and the office of the United Nations High Commissioner for Refugees. The Deputy Director of Communications for UNESCO, two staff of General Electric, a retired Nigerian diplomat and senior UN official who was working on behalf of UNITAR, and a staff member of the Sudan office of the International Organization for Migration were also among the dead. The airline stated that one passenger had a United Nations laissez-passer. The flight was considered a "UN shuttle" due to its role in linking the African Union headquarters as well as other UN offices in Addis Ababa to the United Nations Office at Nairobi, the organisation's headquarters in Africa. The Addis Ababa-Nairobi route is also popular with tourists and business people. An employee of the Norwegian Red Cross, a British intern with the Norwegian Refugee Council, an environmental agent for the Association of Arctic Expedition Cruise Operators, four Catholic Relief Services staff, and a senior Ugandan police official on assignment with the African Union peacekeeping force in Somalia were also killed.

Notable victims on-board included the Italian archaeologist and Councillor for Cultural Heritage of Sicily, Sebastiano Tusa, and Nigerian-Canadian academic Pius Adesanmi. Slovak politician Anton Hrnko lost his wife and two children in the crash. Other notable victims included Christine Alalo, a Ugandan police commissioner and peacekeeper serving with the African Union Mission in Somalia.

Responses 
Ethiopian Prime Minister Abiy Ahmed offered his condolences to the families of the victims. Ethiopian Airlines CEO Tewolde Gebremariam visited the accident site, confirmed that there were no survivors and expressed sympathy and condolences. Boeing issued a statement of condolence.

The Ethiopian parliament declared 11 March as a day of national mourning. During the opening of the fourth United Nations Environment Assembly in Nairobi, a minute of silence was observed in sympathy for the victims. President Muhammadu Buhari of Nigeria, in his condolence message on behalf of the government and the people of Nigeria, extended his sincere condolences to Prime Minister Abiy Ahmed of Ethiopia, the people of Ethiopia, Kenya, Canada, China and all other nations who lost citizens in the crash.

On 11 March, the FAA commented that the Boeing 737 MAX 8 model was airworthy. However, due to concerns on the operation of the aircraft, the FAA ordered Boeing to implement design changes, effective by April. It stated that Boeing "plans to update training requirements and flight crew manuals in response to the design change" to the aircraft's Maneuvering Characteristics Augmentation System (MCAS). The changes will also include enhancements to the activation of the MCAS and the angle of attack signal. Boeing stated that the upgrade was developed in response to the Lion Air crash but did not link it to the Ethiopian Airlines crash.

On 19 March, the U.S. Secretary of Transportation, Elaine L. Chao, sent a memo to the U.S. Inspector General asking him to "proceed with an audit to compile an objective and detailed factual history of the activities that resulted in the certification of the Boeing 737-MAX 8 aircraft."

Flight International commented that the accident would likely increase unease about the Boeing 737 MAX felt in the aftermath of the Lion Air Flight 610 accident in October 2018, which similarly occurred shortly after take-off and killed everyone aboard. Boeing shares dropped 11% over the weekend; by 23 March, Boeing had lost more than $40 billion in market value, dropping some 14% since the crash.

Groundings

Investigation 

The Ethiopian Civil Aviation Authority (ECAA), the agency responsible for investigating civil aviation accidents in Ethiopia, investigated the accident. The aircraft manufacturer, Boeing, stated that it was prepared to work with the United States National Transportation Safety Board (NTSB) and assist Ethiopian Airlines. The United States Federal Aviation Administration also assisted in the investigation.

Both the cockpit voice recorder and the flight data recorder were recovered from the crash site on 11 March. The French aviation accident investigation agency BEA announced that it would analyze the flight recorders from the flight. BEA received the flight recorders on 14 March. On 17 March, Ethiopia's transport minister Dagmawit Moges announced that "the black box has been found in a good condition that enabled us to extract almost all the data inside" and that the preliminary data retrieved from the flight data recorder show a clear similarity with those of Lion Air Flight 610 which crashed off Indonesia.

On 13 March 2019, the FAA announced that new evidence found on the crash site and satellite data on Flight 302 suggested that the aircraft might have suffered from the same problem which the aircraft operating Lion Air Flight 610 had suffered from. Investigators discovered the jackscrew that controlled the pitch angle of the horizontal stabilizer of Flight 302, was in the full "nose down" position. The finding suggested that, at the time of the crash, Flight 302 was configured to dive, similar to Lion Air Flight 610. Due to this finding, some experts in Indonesia suggested that the Indonesian National Transportation Safety Committee (NTSC) should cooperate with Flight 302's investigation team. Later on the evening, the NTSC offered assistance to Flight 302's investigation team, stating that the committee and the Indonesian Transportation Ministry would send investigators and representatives from the government to assist with the investigation of the crash.

Preliminary report 
On 4 April 2019, the ECAA released the preliminary report on the crash. The preliminary report does not specifically mention MCAS but rather states "approximately five seconds after the end of the ANU (aircraft nose up) stabilizer motion, a third instance of AND (aircraft nose down) automatic trim command occurred without any corresponding motion of the stabilizer, which is consistent with the stabilizer trim cutout switches being in the "cutout" position".

About 12 seconds later, the autopilot disengaged. The preliminary report asserts that the thrust remained at takeoff setting (94% N1) and the throttles did not move for the entire flight. In the next 30 seconds the stabilizer trim moved 4.2 degrees nose down, from 4.6 to 0.4 units. In the next 10 seconds the trim moved back up to 2.3 units as a result of pilot input and the pilots agreed on and executed the stabilizer trim cut-out procedure, cutting power to the trim motor operated by MCAS.

Interim report 
On 9 March 2020, the ECAA released an interim report on the crash. This report stated that the left and right angle of attack (AOA) values deviated by 59°. The AOA disagree message did not appear. The left minimum operating speed and left stick shaker speed was computed to be greater than the maximum operating speed without any invalidity detection. The pitch Flight Director bars disappeared then reappeared with left and right displaying different guidance. The left stick shaker activated. The nose-down trim (MCAS) triggered four times. The right over-speed clacker activated. On the third MCAS trigger there was no corresponding motion of the stabilizer, which is consistent with the stabilizer trim cutout switches being in the "cutout" position at that moment. The MCAS design relied on single AOA sensor inputs making it vulnerable to undesired activation. The difference training from B737NG to B737 MAX was inadequate.

Final report 
On 23 December 2022, the ECAA released the final report in the crash, which stated:

On 27 December 2022, the NTSB released its comments on the accident separately from the final report, saying that the Ethiopian authorities failed to include them in or append them to their report. The NTSB's comments read in part:

The BEA also submitted comments to the draft final report, in which it disagrees with some aspects of the Ethiopian findings, specifically regarding crew performance. The introduction to the BEA's comments reads in part:

Reactions to the investigation

Statements from parties
Ethiopian Airlines said MCAS was "to the best of our knowledge" active when the aircraft crashed. According to Ethiopian transport minister Dagmawit Moges, the crew "performed all the procedures repeatedly provided by the manufacturer but was not able to control the aircraft". Bjorn Fehrm from Leeham News stated the preliminary report confirms "the Flight Crew followed the procedures prescribed by FAA and Boeing in Airworthiness Directive 2018-23-51", released shortly after the Lion Air crash.

Boeing's CEO Dennis Muilenburg said on 29 April that if "you go through the checklist...it calls out actions that would be taken around power management and pitch management of the airplane. It also refers to the cutout switches, that after an activation that was not pilot-induced, that you would hit the cutout switches. And, in some cases, those procedures were not completely followed".

A data spike in the flight data led to speculations about a bird or other debris hitting the plane as it was taking off, shearing away the airflow sensor. These speculations were dismissed by Ethiopian Airlines, and Chief investigator Amdye Ayalew Fanta stated there was no indication of such damage.

On 25 April, The Aviation Herald submitted 25 questions that have arisen in the aftermath of the accident to the FAA's Flight Standardization Board (FSB) regarding their draft for certification of the Boeing 737 MAX aircraft. Earlier, it stated that a copy of the version of section 2.6 of the Flight Operations Manual, "Operational Irregularities", in use by Ethiopian Airlines at the time of the crash was dated 1 November 2017 and did not include material from the Operator's Bulletin issued by Boeing on 6 November 2018.

Expert analysis 
Based on the preliminary report, The Aviation Herald comes to the conclusion: "Neither of the three crews" (JT-43, JT-610, ET-302) "would have been forced to react under time pressure in order to prevent a crash, [...] without the technical malfunctions [of the angle of attack sensors] and the nose down trim inputs."

According to The Air Current aviation journal and The Seattle Times, the preliminary report shows the pilots initially followed the procedure to disable runaway trim, but the recovery effort did not succeed. Pilots have demonstrated in simulator that the trim wheels cannot be moved in severe mis-trim conditions combined with a high airspeed. As the pilots on Flight 302 pulled on the yoke to raise the nose, the aerodynamic forces on the tail's elevator would create an opposing force on the stabilizer trim jackscrew that would prevent the pilots from moving the trim wheel by hand.

The resolution for this jammed trim issue is not part of Boeing's current 737 manual according to The Air Current. The Seattle Times reports pilots on the 737-200 were trained for this failure, but later models became so reliable that this procedure was no longer necessary.

Experts theorize that the difficulty to trim made it necessary for the flight crew to release the cutout, and try to use electronic trim in an effort to correct the out-of-trim configuration. According to Bjorn Fehrm (Leeham News) and Peter Lemme at this time the airplane was flying "at 375kts and MCAS was never designed to trim at these Speed/Altitude combinations".

Pilot analysis 
John Cox, a former 737 pilot and pilots' union safety representative, and Chesley Sullenberger, who successfully ditched US Airways Flight 1549 in the Hudson River, both did Flight Simulator replications of Flight 302. Cox described the rapid onset of unforeseen events as a "...breeding ground for confusion and task saturation." Sullenberger commented that "Even knowing what was going to happen, I could see how crews would have run out of time and altitude before they could have solved the problems." While defending the pilots' actions, Sullenberger was also highly critical of allowing someone with only 200 hours of flight experience to be first officer.

Dramatization 
 The crash was mentioned in the 21st season of the TV series Mayday in an episode entitled "Grounded: Boeing Max 8".
 In February 2022, Netflix released Downfall: The Case Against Boeing, a documentary about the Lion Air Flight 610 and Ethiopian Airlines Flight 302 plane crashes.
 In September 2022, Amazon Prime released Flight/Risk, a feature documentary about the two Boeing 737 MAX crashes.

See also 
Ethiopian Airlines accidents and incidents
Lion Air Flight 610 – the other Boeing 737 MAX accident which occurred four months prior

Notes

References

Further reading

External links 
  
  
 
 Analysis of preliminary report: timeline and human factor 
 
 
 Difficulty to trim 
  — 737NG simulator demonstration of the difficulty to trim in an out-of-trim situation similar to the accident.
  — Graphical illustration of the trim issue.
 Summary of the 737 Max crashes 
 
 

2019 disasters in Ethiopia
2019 in Ethiopia
Accidents and incidents involving the Boeing 737 MAX
Airliner accidents and incidents caused by design or manufacturing errors
Aviation accidents and incidents in 2019
Aviation accidents and incidents in Ethiopia
Aviation accident investigations with disputed causes
Flight 302
March 2019 events in Africa
Oromia Region